Elena of Avalor is an American computer-animated adventure television series that premiered on Disney Channel on July 22, 2016, and moved to Disney Junior on July 14, 2018. The series features Aimee Carrero as the voice of Elena, a Latina princess.

In July 2020, Disney announced that Elena of Avalor would end after three seasons. The series finale, "Coronation Day" aired on August 23, 2020.

Plot 
Princess Elena Castillo Flores, now grown up, has saved her magical kingdom of Avalor from an evil sorceress and must now learn to rule as its crowned princess. Elena's adventures will lead her to understand that her new role requires thoughtfulness, resilience, and compassion, the traits of all truly great leaders. Since she is only 16 years old, she must follow the guidance of a Grand Council, composed of her grandparents, older cousin Chancellor Esteban, and a new friend, Naomi Turner. Elena also looks to her younger sister, Isabel, her friends, wizard Mateo, and Royal Guard lieutenant, Gabe, a spirit animal named Zuzo, and a trio of magical flying creatures called Jaquins for guidance and support.

Episodes

Characters

Production 

The series' creator and executive producer Craig Gerber said: "It was very important to us that, since we were doing a show with a kingdom inspired by Latin American culture, that we get that right. Even though it's a fairytale world, there are things that feel very authentic." Story editor Silvia Olivas stated: "We have cultural consultants help us every step of the way. They read everything from the premise all the way through the final draft." On the show's music, Latin music consultant Rene Camacho said: "The styles of music we're using overall — it's all Latin-based, it's very festive." Consultant Diane Rodriguez stated that the series "has this visual element that's so evocative, it takes the look of the Latino culture, of the Americas, almost to another level." In June 2016, the music video for "My Time" was released. The series was renewed for a second season on August 11, 2016. The series was renewed for a third season on February 13, 2017. The second season premiered on October 14, 2017.

On September 17, 2019, it was announced that the third season would premiere on October 7, 2019.

Broadcast 
The debut episode "First Day of Rule" was distributed on-demand on June 20, 2016 by Rogers TV in Canada. Disney scheduled the online release in the United States for July 1, 2016. An episode of the series aired as a sneak peek on Disney Channel in the UK and Ireland on July 15, 2016, and more episodes aired later in the year. A television movie titled Elena and the Secret of Avalor, which shows the origins of the series, premiered on November 20, 2016.
The series' final episode, a one-hour special, "Elena of Avalor: Coronation Day" aired on August 23, 2020.

Home media
Home media is distributed by Walt Disney Studios Home Entertainment.

Reception 

The series received a positive reception. Emily Ashby of Common Sense Media described the series protagonist, Elena, as a "spunky Latina-inspired princess" and said she is an "excellent role model." She said that while a few scenes might be "scary for youngsters" there are strong themes of "friendship, family relationships...honesty, fairness, and kindness" and called the series funny and heartwarming. She additionally argued that the show's incorporation of Latin influences was a "welcome change in kids' programming."

Ratings 
 

| link2             = List of Elena of Avalor episodes#Season 2 (2017–18)
| episodes2         = 24
| start2            = 
| end2              = 
| startrating2         = 1.18
| endrating2           = 0.51
| viewers2          = |2}} 

| link3 = List of Elena of Avalor episodes#Season 3 (2019–20)
| episodes3      = 22
| start3      = 
| end3        = 
| startrating3    = 0.33
| endrating3      = 0.34
}}

Awards and nominations

Notes

References

External links 

 
 

2010s American animated television series
2020s American animated television series
2016 American television series debuts
2020 American television series endings
American animated television spin-offs
American children's animated action television series
American children's animated adventure television series
American children's animated fantasy television series
American children's animated musical television series
American children's animated supernatural television series
American computer-animated television series
English-language television shows
Disney Channel original programming
Disney Junior original programming
Television series by Disney Television Animation
Television series about princesses
Television series set in fictional countries
Hispanic and Latino American culture